Hannu Koponen (born 8 November 1959, in Kaavi) is a Finnish ski-orienteering competitor and world champion.

Awards 
He received a gold medal in the short course, a gold medal in the relay, and a silver medal in the long course at the 1988 World Ski Orienteering Championships in Kuopio.

See also
 Finnish orienteers
 List of orienteers
 List of orienteering events

References

1959 births
Living people
People from Kaavi
Finnish orienteers
Male orienteers
Ski-orienteers
Sportspeople from North Savo